Ingemar Lindh (born 21 February 1945 in Gothenburg, Sweden) is a theatre director and pedagogue.

Biography

After his first theatrical experiences at the local theatre school Skara Skolscen and straw jobs at the Municipal Theatre in Stockholm, he educated himself at Stora Teaterns Ballettskola in Gothenburg, the National Academy of Ballett in Stockholm and at the School of Etienne Decroux in Paris where, after 2 years as pupil, he became the assistant of the great master and creator of "le mime corporelle". In 1971 he founds in Storhögen, Sweden, the theatre company Institutet för Scenkonst where he will work as director, pedagogue and muse throughout his life. He participates as guest teacher and artist at the 1981's session of ISTA: International School of Theatre Anthropology, in Volterra, Italy. The same year he was asked by Eugenio Barba to take care of the training of the younger generation at Odin Teatret, which he did for a short period of time. From 1984 to 1996 he lived in Pontremoli where he direct, in Teatro la Rosa, a School of Theatre.  In 1995 he is cofounder of the research program xCHA (questioning Human Creativity as Acting), created inside the structure of the University of Malta. Ingemar Lindh dies 26 June 1997 in Malta during a short pause while teaching with his colleagues from Institutet för Scenkonst during a theatre workshop.

Bibliography

The paper canoe: a guide to theatre anthropology by Eugenio Barba, London, Routledge, 1995
Pietre di Guado" by Ingemar Lindh (original edition) Pontedera, Bandecchi & Vivaldi, 1997Stenar att gå på by Ingemar Lindh (introduction by Willmar Sauter) Möklinta, Gidlunds förlag, 2003Stepping Stones by Ingemar Lindh (introduction by Frank Camilleri), Holstebro-Malta-Wroclaw, Icarus Publishing Enterprise, 2010

 Notes 

 References Words on Decroux by Thomas Leabhart, Pomona College Theatre Dept., 1997A Dictionary of Theatre Anthropology: The Secret Art of the Performer by Eugenio Barba, London, Routledge, 1991Stones of water'' by Julia Varley, London, Routledge, 2011

External links
Institutet för Scenkonst

Links to fellow theatre researchers and research centers:
The Grotowski's Institute, Poland
Odin Teatret, Denmark
Workcenter of Jerzy Grotowski and Thomas Richard, Italy

Links of related theatre companies:
Studium Actoris, Norway
Grenland Friteater, Norway
Actör, Sweden
OutlawFields, Danmark
Theatre du Jour (B. Stanley), Washington D.C, USA

1945 births
1997 deaths
Swedish theatre directors
Swedish mimes